Hakea linearis is a shrub or tree in the family  Proteacea and is endemic to Western Australia. It has smooth branches, mostly linear leaves and white flowers.

Description

It blooms from January to May or October to December and produces cream-white flowers. The rugose to black-pusticulate fruits have an obliquely obovate shape with a curved apex. The seeds within have an obliquely obovate shape and a wing down one side.

Taxonomy and naming
The species was first formally described by the botanist Robert Brown in 1810 and the description was published in Transactions of the Linnean Society of London.
The specific epithet is taken from the Latin word linearis meaning "linear", which refers to the shape of the leaves.
It can be confused with Hakea varia and related species.

Distribution and habitat
It is endemic to an area along the coast in the South West and Great Southern regions of Western Australia between Busselton in the west, Wagin to the north and Albany to the south. It is often found among granite outcrops and seasonally damp areas like swamps growing in sandy or sandy-clay soils and is usually part of sandy heathland or Eucalyptus woodland communitities.

References

linearis
Eudicots of Western Australia
Plants described in 1810
Taxa named by Robert Brown (botanist, born 1773)